Descampsiella is a genus of grasshoppers belonging to the family Euschmidtiidae.

Species:
 Descampsiella annulipes (Descamps, 1964)

References

Euschmidtiidae
Caelifera genera